Khyanikaa: The Lost Idea is a 2017 Odia language independent feature film written and directed by Amartya Bhattacharyya. The film won the state award for Best Editing at the 29th Odisha State Film awards which was awarded to the filmmaker Amartya Bhattacharyya, who was also the editor of the film.

The treatment of the film is more like a satire with moments of humorous illustrations of serious reality and often merging into spaces of magic realism and surrealism. The film was the only Odia language film at the Indian Panorama at 48th International Film Festival of India 2017. The film also gathered a lot of critical acclamation at the international film festival circuit. The film is produced by Swastik Choudhury under the banner of Swastik Arthouse.

The film was premiered at Hidden Gems Film Festival in Canada followed by a number of other festivals including the Dhaka International Film Festival and Ethiopian International Film Festival. The film won the Honorable Jury Mention award at 5th Noida International Film Festival 2018.

Cast 
 Amrita Chowdhury as Idea
 Swastik Choudhury as British
 Susant Misra  as Lazy Man
 Choudhury Bikash Das as Mad Man
 Hrushikesh Bhoi as Fate
 Dipanwit Dashmohapatra as Postman
 Anu Choudhury as Commercial actress
 Bhaswati Basu as Lazy Man's wife

Critical reception 
The film earned a lot of critical acclaim from the film festival circuit. The Navhind Times listed Khyanikaa in its list of must-watch films of IFFI for 2017.

Film critic Taryll Baker, in his review published on UK Film Review, writes - "Amartya Bhattacharyya’s Khyanikaa: The Lost Idea throws us into a wonderland filled with impeccable colour and strange but convivial characters."

Soumika M Das, film critic of the New Indian Express, writes - "Defying the conventional formula of filmmaking, director Amartya Bhattacharya explores the problems of contemporary lives with satirical undertones in his Odia film, Khayanikaa The Lost Idea. His portrayal of the plot resembles the fashion in which a modern author presents his ideas in a stream of consciousness novel."

Controversy 
In June 2020, Khyanikaa released on Amazon Prime Videos, but was removed from the Indian territory after a couple of days. An official spokesperson was quoted saying "The Odia film Khyanikaa: The Lost Idea was inadvertently made available by the distributors of the film, through the self-publishing program Prime Video Direct. We regret this error. When Prime Video launched in India over 3 years ago, we were offering content across 5 Indian languages namely Hindi, Tamil, Telugu, Bengali and Marathi. Since then, we have carefully and consistently curated our local library, which currently features content in 9 Indian languages including Hindi, Kannada, Gujarati, Punjabi, Tamil, Telugu, Marathi, Bengali and Malayalam."

It led to a strong protest on social media. While film lovers used the hash tag #BringKhyanikaaBack as a mark of protest, Koraput MP Saptagiri Ulaka met the Union Minister of Information and Broadcasting Prakash Jadevekar to raise the concern.

Film festival screenings

References

2010s Odia-language films
2017 films